Eric Richardson may refer to:

 Eric Richardson (Australian footballer) (1891–1969), Australian rules footballer
 Eric Richardson (American football) (born 1962), American wide receiver